Wilhelm Killmayer, a German composer, wrote several song cycles, which form a substantial part of his compositions. The earliest cycle dates from 1953, the last was completed in 2008. He set poems by German romantic writers such as Friedrich Hölderlin and Joseph von Eichendorff, but was also inspired by French, Greek and Spanish poems, and by texts from the 20th-century poets Georg Trakl and Peter Härtling. He used mostly piano to accompany a singer, but also added percussion or other instruments, and scored some cycles in a version for voice and orchestra. His Hölderlin-Lieder, setting poems from the author's late period, were performed at major festivals and recorded.

Overview 
Interested in poetry and the voice, Killmayer composed more than 200 Lieder, including several song cycles. Most of them are set for voice and piano. Many songs set poems from German romantic poetry, such as others on 20th-century poems. Killmayer wrote four cycles of Hölderlin-Lieder based on poems by Friedrich Hölderlin, especially from his late period, two cycles based on Georg Trakl (1993 and 1996), and one based on Peter Härtling (1993).

Killmayer was first inspired by texts of French authors of the Renaissance, such as Charles d'Orléans, Mal Mariée and Clément Marot (1953), and by poems of Federico García Lorca in German (1954), which he set for soprano, piano, ensemble or percussion. From the 1990s, he composed cycles on poems by Stéphane Mallarmé and Sappho. Returning to German romanticism he set two song cycles based on poems by Joseph von Eichendorff for men's chorus, a songbook  inspired by Heinrich Heine, a cycle based on poems and Eduard Mörike. His song cycles, as his other works, were published by Schott.

The following table contains for every song cycle the title with translation, the year of composition, the text source and its language, voice type (soprano, coloratura soprano, mezzo-soprano, tenor, baritone), and the number of movements.

Song cycles

Vier Canzonen nach Texten von Petrarca 
The cycle, composed in 1950, sets four poems by Petrarch for mixed choir a cappella:
 
 
 
 

The whole lasts about 9 minutes. It was recorded in 2000 by chamber choir Josquin des Prèz under Uwe Witzel.

Rêveries 
The cycle, composed in 1953, sets five old French poems for soprano, piano and percussion:
  (13th century)
  (15th century)
  (Charles d'Orléans)
 Lamento (Clément Marot)
  (Charles d'Orleans)

The cycle takes about 13 minutes. It was first performed on 30 July 1953 in Bayreuth by Liselotte Ebnet with the composer as the pianist and Hermann Gschwendtner.

Romanzen 
The cycle, composed in 1954, sets five poems by Federico García Lorca, translated by Enrique Beck, for soprano, piano and percussion:
 
 
 
 Ghasel
 Lamento

The duration of the work is about 15 minutes. It was first performed on 25 April 1953 in Chicago by Leontyne Price.

Blasons anatomiques du corps féminin 
The cycle, composed in 1968, sets six French poems for soprano and the Pierrot ensemble. Overall duration is about a quarter of an hour.
  (Clément Marot)
  (Gilles d'Aurigny)
  (anonymous)
  (Lancelot de Carle)
   (Claude Chappuys)
  (anonymous) 

It was first performed on 6 July 1968 in Munich by Joan Carroll, with the composer as the pianist. It was recorded, with the Sappho-Lieder and the Mörike-Lieder, in 2012 on the occasion of the composer's 85th birthday by members of the Musikhochschule München.

Drei Gesänge nach Hölderlin 

The cycle, composed in 1965, sets three poems by Hölderlin for baritone and piano:
 
 
 

It was first performed on 23 April 1968 at the Bayerische Akademie der Schönen Künste in Munich by Heinz Wilbrink and the composer.

Hölderlin-Lieder 
A first cycle , setting 19 poems from his late period, was composed between 1982 and 1985. A tenor voice is accompanied by piano or orchestra. The work lasts about 40 minutes. The orchestral version was premiered in Munich on 3 February 1986 by Peter Schreier with the Bayerisches Staatsorchester, conducted by Wolfgang Sawallisch. The piano version was first performed on 23 August 1989 as part of the festival Frankfurt Feste, by Christoph Prégardien and Siegfried Mauser.

A second cycle, setting 18 poems from his late period with the same scoring tenor voice, with a total duration of about 45 minutes, was composed between 1982 and 1985. The orchestral version was premiered at the Salzburg Festival on 14 August 1987 by Peter Schreier and the ORF-Symphonieorchester, conducted by Lothar Zagrosek. The piano version was first performed, with the first cycle, on 23 August 1989 by Prégardien and Mauser. The singer recorded in 2010 four songs of the second cycle, together with songs by Robert Schumann and Gustav Mahler titled Wanderer, in an arrangement for small ensemble by the composer. A reviewer notes that Killmayer "demonstrates a real affinity with the Romantic poet" and describes the arrangement as "highly attractive scores with their spare and finely wrought chamber accompaniments".

A third cycle, setting 7 poems from his late period for tenor and piano, lasting 21 minutes, was composed between 1983 and 1992. It was premiered in Vienna on 22 November 1991 Wien for Wien Modern by Prégardien and Mauser. It was recorded in 2017 by Markus Schäfer and Mauser, together with the two cycles after Trakl, in 2017, titled Sommersneige (Summer's End).

Prégardien and Mauser recorded all three cycles in 1992. A reviewer for Gramophone notes that Killmayer thought of the poet's last period as "possessed by a special 'understanding of reality'". He describes "moments of dissonance, and unusual textural dispositions", but generally focused "on simple chordal and melodic patterns, not to create an atmosphere of expressionistic anguish, but to suggest a calm, joyous acceptance of the inevitable".

Neun Lieder nach Gedichten von Peter Härtling 
The cycle  was composed in 1993, setting nine  poems by the contemporary author Peter Härtling:

 
 
 
 
 
 
 
 
 

It was premiered at the Linden-Museum in Stuttgart on 27 November 1993 by Mitsuko Shirai and Hartmut Höll.

Trakl-Lieder 
The cycle  was composed in 1993, setting eight poems by Trakl:

 
 
 
 
 
 
 
 

It was recorded in 2017 by Markus Schäfer and Mauser, together with the third cycle of Hölderlin-Lieder and the second cycle based on Trakl, in 2017, titled Sommersneige (Summer's End) after the fifth movement.

Sappho-Lieder 
The cycle , based on 15 poems by Sappho, was composed between 1993 and 2008. The whole takes about half an hour to perform.

 
 
 
 
 
 
 
 
 
 
 
 
 
 
 

The cycle was premiered in the Linden-Museum in Stuttgart on 31 March 2008 by Mojca Erdmann and Siegfried Mauser.

Heine-Lieder 
The cycle  was composed in 1994 and 1995, subtitled Ein Liederbuch nach Gedichten von Heinrich Heine (A songbook after poems by Heinrich Heine). Killmayer set 37 of his poems in four sections (Abteilung), for a total duration of about 80 minutes:

  (eight songs, including "")
  (twelve songs)
  (ten songs including "")
  (seven songs including "")
Poems by Heine have been set to music by many composers, including Robert Schumann who composed in 1840 Dichterliebe on texts from Heine's Lyrisches Intermezzo, including also "" and "". Killmayer observed a difference in the approach to setting Heine's poems: 

The composition was premiered at the Liederhalle in Stuttgart on 16 November 1995 by Christoph Prégardien and Siegfried Mauser, with the composer for recitation.

Schweigen und Kindheit 
The cycle  was composed in 1993 , setting six more poems by Trakl:

 , first version)
  (fifth version)
 Elis (first version)
  (first version)
 
 , first version)

It was premiered in Munich on 3 December 1996 by Sebastian Leebmann and Siegfried Mauser. It was recorded in 2017 by Markus Schäfer and Mauser, together with the third cycle of Hölderlin-Lieder and the first cycle based on Trakl, titled Sommersneige (Summer's End).

Mörike-Lieder 
The cycle  was composed in 2003 and 2004, setting 15 poems by Eduard Mörike:

 
 
 
 
 
 
 
 
 
 
 
 
 
 
 

References

External links 
 

Contemporary classical compositions
Classical song cycles in French
Classical song cycles in German
1953 compositions
1954 compositions
1965 compositions
1968 compositions
1982 compositions
1983 compositions
1993 compositions
1996 compositions
2004 compositions
2008 compositions
Musical settings of poems by Heinrich Heine
Musical settings of poems by Friedrich Hölderlin
Adaptations of works by Joseph von Eichendorff